Mantri Vancheeswaran Mani (1904-1952) was an Indian freedom fighter and Conservationist. In 1938, he created the South Indian Film Artistes Association and served as Secretary under P.N. Velu Nair, the Association's President. Mani's contributions were described by Tamil actor and Chief Minister of Tamil Nadu M.G. Ramachandran in his autobiography Nan Yaean Piranthaen.

Early life 

M.V. Mani's birth name was Vancheeswaran Subramanian. He was born on 15 July 1904, in Vaikom, a temple city situated in the Kottayam District in the Indian state of Kerala, the oldest son of Vancheeswaran and Kaveri Ammal. Inclined towards acting at an early age, Mani decided to leave home at the age of eleven to pursue his passion with just four annas (equivalent to one Indian rupee 25 paise) in hand.

Mani first worked as a cook in Malayatur, after which he traveled to Thanjavur to learn Carnatic music. By the age of sixteen, Mani had acquired musical proficiency and, with very little money, he traveled all the way to Madras (now known as Chennai) to further his engagement with the performing arts.

Entry into Chennai and involvement in the theatre and film industry 

Mani joined the renowned drama troupe "Ottraivaadai Theatre", a group run by Jagannatha Iyer, to launch his career as an actor. During his time with the troupe, Mani performed in plays entitled Lava Kusa, Pathi Pakti, Rajambal, and Krishna Leela. Mani's role as a judge in the drama Rajambal is often lauded as his best performance with the troupe, an accomplishment that later brought him a role of an advocate in the film version of the play.

N.S. Krishnan recommended Mani for the role of the detective Srinivasan in the film Sathi Leelavathi, the debut film of the legendary actor M.G. Ramachandran, who later became the Chief Minister of Tamil Nadu. Ramachandran mentioned Mani in his autobiography Naan Yaen Piraenthaen. During those years Mani was associated with many well-known movie personalities such as S.S. Vasan, A. Nageswara Rao, Anjali Devi, M.G. Chakrapani, R.S. Manohar, N.C. Vasanthakokilam, K.B. Sundarambal, G.N. Balasubramanian, T.N. Rajaratnam Pillai, Comedian Sarangapani, T.S. Balaiah, M.K. Radha and Ellis Duncan of Hollywood.

In Tamil movies, Mani played an important role in Sathi Anusaya with the Great Carnatic musician-actor G.N. Balasubramaniam (GNB), Sri Kandha Leela with the popular and versatile actress K.B. Sundarambal (Avvaiyaar Pugazh) followed by Kalamegam, with the legendary Nadhaswara Vidvan "Rajarathnam Pillai". In Venu Ganam, he co-starred with the famous Carnatic Music Singer N.C. Vasantha Kokilam, followed by an appearance in Maccha Reka with the celebrated Artist T.R. Mahalingam.

His acting prowess caused the great S.S. Vasan to offer Mani the impressive role of Patti [Minister] in Vasan's film Dasi Aparanji, which was a hit film of those days. Mani's role as Minister earned him the appellation Manthri V. Mani, in short, M.V. Mani. In "Madana Mala" Mani showcased his talent in sword fighting.

Entry into freedom fighting and social work 

Mani was a true Gandhian and took part in the freedom struggle. He shared the platform in public meetings with Rajaji, Namakkal Rajamanikkam Pillai, Kalki Krishnamurthi and others. His own trials and tribulations in the film industry urged him to create an association with the motive of enhancing the status of people associated with the film industry in general and actors in particular.
 
Mani finally succeeded in his efforts, forming the Film Actors Association with Mr. P.S. Velu Nair presiding as President and Mani himself as the first secretary. The seed that Mani had so industriously sown grew into a monumental tree: with Sthala Vriksha becoming a strong film actor's welfare advocacy organisation, now known as the Nadigar Sangam.

Filmography 

Sathi Leelavathi (1936), produced by Manorama Films and directed by Ellis R. Dungan [Hollywood], with actors M.V. Mani, M.K. Radha, T.S. Balaiya, M.G. Ramachandran [a legendary actor who later become Chief Minister of Tamil Nadu] N.S. Krishnan and T.A. Maduram. (See the review from The Hindu, dated 07/14.04.2016)
Sathi Anusuya (1937), produced by M.A.S. & Company, directed by Prem Ratna. The main actors were G.N. Balasubramaniyam, legendary Carnatic Musician, and T.S. Balaiya.
Sri Kandha Leela (1938), produced by Kovai Premier Cinetone [P] Ltd,; directed by H.S. Mehta with actors M.V. Mani, M.G. Dhandapani, K.B. Sundarambal, Danalakshmi, and others. (See the review from The Hindu, dated 30.03.2013)
Kalamegam (1940), M.V. Mani (also known as Thanjavur Mani) acted in this film with the celebrated Nadaswara Vidwan T.N. Rajamanickam Pillai.
Venu Ganam (1941), M.V. Mani acted with celebrated Carnatic vocalist N.C. Vasanthakokilam. (See the review from The Hindu dated 12.02.2010)
Bhakta Naradar (1942), produced by Tamil Nadu Talkies, directed by S. Soundar Rajan, performed by M.V. Mani, Kotthamangalam Seenu, Kotthamangalam Subbu, S.R. Janaki, and others.
Anandan (1942), written and directed by S.D.S. Yogi, acted with S.D.R. Chandran, B. Saraswathi, etc. (See the review from The Hindu, dated 01.11.2015)
Dasi Aparanji (1944), produced by S.S. Vasan of Gemini Studios, directed by B.N. Rao, with actors M.V. Mani, Pushpavalli, M.K. Radha, N.A. Sundarm, Kotthamangalam Subbu, M.S. Sundari Bai and others. (See the review from The Hindu dated 19.09.2008)
Jagadalapradhapan (1944), produced by S.M. Sriramulu Naidu, acted by M.V. Mani, P.U. Chinnappaa, T.S. Balaiya, and others. Watch the Video:YOU TUBE. Dated 14 August 2010
Deiva Needhi (1947), acted by P. Kannamba and K.R. Ramasamy, etc., (see the review from The Hindu Dated: 12.12.2010)
Madana Mala (1948), directed by K. Vembu, acted by M.V. Mani with P.B. Rangachari, P.S. Veerappa, R.N. Nambiar (See the review from The Hindu, dated 05.03.2011)
Maya Malai (1951), directed by Mirshavur Raja Saheb, acted by M.V. Mani, A. Nageswara Rao and Anjali Devi.
Rajambal (1951), produced by Arunaa Films, directed by S. Balachander, acted by R.S. Manohar and Mathuri Devi. (See the review from The Hindu dated 03.01.2009).
Manavathi (1952), directed by P.V. Ramanna, acted by Y.V. Rao and S. Varalakshmi.

References

1904 births
1952 deaths
20th-century Indian male actors
Indian male film actors
Male actors from Kerala
People from Vaikom